The Moskalyev SAM-10 was a late 1930s Soviet light transport aircraft suited to passenger or ambulance roles. Despite proving outstanding in trials, engine supply curtailed its production.

Design and development

The low-wing Moskalyev SAM-10 was a development of the wooden, high cantilever wing SAM-5bis-2. Its wings, as well as the rear fuselage and tail, were originally built for the SAM-5bis-2. They had twin spars with plywood skin around the leading edge and fabric covering aft. 

The SAM-10 was powered by a  Bessonov MM-1, a  six cylinder. air-cooled, inverted inline engine, though its unobtainability led to the SAM-10bis, fitted instead with a  Voronezh MV-6, a similar six cylinder engine. The engine cowling was light alloy, as were the cabin roof frames, but the rest of the fuselage had a wooden structure, the forward part covered with ply and the rest with fabric. At the rear, the fin was triangular, carrying a narrower, round-tipped rudder. Its cantilever tailplane was mounted on top of the fuselage.

The undercarriage was fixed and conventional with mainwhels on oleo struts, enclosed in aerofoil section trouser fairings, and a skid under the tail.

Operational history

The date of the SAM-10s first flight is not known but it underwent two months of official tests from early June 1938. Its outstanding performance resulted in orders for both passenger and ambulance configurations but the unavailability of its engine blocked production.

In response, two SAM-10bis, powered by the more available but less powerful MV-6 and with unaltered dimensions but one less seat, were built. The reduced power reduced performance, for example, the time taken to reach  rose from 2.7 to 3.2 minutes; no further orders were forthcoming.

Variants

SAM-10Original 5/6 seat passenger or ambulance, with  MM-1 engine.

SAM-10bis4/5 seats, with  MV-6 engine.

Specifications (SAM-10)

References

Single-engined tractor aircraft
Low-wing aircraft
1930s Soviet civil utility aircraft
Moskalyev aircraft